Alexei David Sayle (born 7 August 1952) is an English actor, author, stand-up comedian, television presenter and former recording artist. He was a leading figure in the British alternative comedy movement in the 1980s. He was voted the 18th greatest stand-up comic of all time on Channel 4's 100 Greatest Stand-ups in 2007. In an updated 2010 poll he came 72nd.

Much of Sayle's humour is in the tradition of Spike Milligan and Monty Python, with riffs based on often absurd and surreal premises. His act is known for its cynicism and political awareness, as well as physical comedy.

Early life
Sayle was born and brought up in the Anfield suburb of Liverpool, the son of Molly (Malka) Sayle (née Mendelson), a pools clerk, and Joseph Henry Sayle, a railway guard, both of whom were members of the Communist Party of Great Britain. Sayle's mother was of Lithuanian Jewish descent, and some members of his family were devout Jews.

From 1964 to 1969, he attended Alsop High School in Walton, and was expelled halfway through sixth form. After that, Sayle took a foundation course in art at Southport, before attending Chelsea College of Art and Design in London. He attended Garnett College in Roehampton, a training college for teachers in further education.

Career

Stand-up comedy and theatre
When The Comedy Store opened in London in 1979, Sayle responded to an advert in Private Eye for would-be comedians and became its first master of ceremonies. In 1980, comedy producer Martin Lewis saw Sayle perform at the Edinburgh Festival Fringe and became his manager.

Sayle became the leading performer at The Comic Strip. He appeared on The Comic Strip Album (1981) and recorded Cak! (1982). He also appeared in the stage show, film and comedy album of The Secret Policeman's Other Ball (1981–1982). Sayle's material covered a broad range of topics, but one of his favourite subjects remained politics. His angry persona, coupled with his vociferous delivery, gave immense bite to his material. A typical example of Sayle's humour was his attack on American phrases: "If you travel to the States ... they have a lot of different words than like what we use. For instance: they say 'elevator', we say 'lift'; they say 'drapes', we say 'curtains'; they say 'president', we say 'seriously deranged git!'"

In 1988 Sayle played the role of Trinculo the King's jester in Shakespeare's The Tempest, directed by Jonathan Miller at the Old Vic theatre in London.
Sixteen years on from his last stand-up comedy tour, Sayle returned in 2011 as an MC, compering the middle section of At Last! The 1981 Show, produced by Stewart Lee at the Royal Festival Hall. Although this was mainly a nostalgia night with comedians such as Nigel Planer and Norman Lovett revisiting their material from the 1980s, Sayle premiered some new material that was more anecdotal than his previous work. Sayle says of his old style, "What I was doing, which I hadn’t realised, was a comic persona. The guy in the tight suit was actually a creation. I thought it was me in a sense but it wasn’t".

With artists such as Isy Suttie and Jim Bob, Sayle appeared at the fourth "Nine Lessons and Carols for Godless People" event at the Bloomsbury Theatre in December 2011. In January and February 2012, he compered four nights of stand-up comedy at the Soho Theatre.  He completed a full UK stand-up tour in October and November 2012 and a sixteen-night residency at the Soho Theatre in January and February 2013, where he performed new material. He played a further ten nights at the Soho Theatre in April 2013. He also performed at the 2013 Edinburgh Festival Fringe. He has toured extensively in recent years.

Radio
Sayle's early work included several performances for Capital London. In 1979, he wrote and performed the radio series, Alexei Sayle and the Fish People, for which he won a Pye Radio Award (later known as the Sony Radio Awards). An album based on the show, The Fish People Tapes, again featuring Sayle, was released. This was followed by Alexei Sayle and the Dutch Lieutenant's Trousers in 1980, the name being a reference to John Fowles' The French Lieutenant's Woman. He also starred in two series of Lenin of the Rovers, a 1988 comedy about Britain's first communist football team. He has since contributed to many other radio shows, including writing the five-part sitcom series, Sorry About Last Night (1999), in which he also played the leading role. On 3 November 2006 he presented Chopwell Soviet, a 30-minute programme on BBC Radio 4 that reviewed the Chopwell miners 80 years after the village of Chopwell became known as Little Moscow. Sayle returned to Radio 4 in 2016 with Alexei Sayle's Imaginary Sandwich Bar. In 2019, he narrated the dramatisation of four of his short stories in the series Alexei Sayle's The Absence of Normal, again on Radio 4. A second series was broadcast in 2021.

Television
Sayle's first high-profile television appearances were on Central Independent Television's late-night alternative cabaret show O.T.T. (1982). He left nine weeks into the show's run to tour Australia with the Comic Strip. He played various roles in the situation comedy The Young Ones (1982–1984), along with Adrian Edmondson, Rik Mayall, Nigel Planer and Christopher Ryan. In the programme Sayle portrayed several members of an Eastern European family; the Balowskis. In 1985, he appeared in the Doctor Who serial Revelation of the Daleks. In a column for a British tabloid newspaper around the same time, he indicated that he wanted to become the "first Socialist Doctor."  He also appeared in several episodes of The Comic Strip Presents... between 1985 and 1993, playing the two leading roles in Didn't You Kill My Brother? which he co-wrote with David Stafford and Pauline Melville. Sayle has co-written and starred in many other programmes, including three series of  Alexei Sayle's Stuff (1988–1991), two series of The All New Alexei Sayle Show (1994–1995) and one series of Alexei Sayle's Merry-Go-Round (1998).

In 1989, Sayle was awarded an International Emmy for Stuff. In conversation with Mark Thomas on BBC Radio 4's informal chat-show Chain Reaction, Sayle revealed that the first he knew of the award was when he watched Channel 4 News and saw, to his amazement, Benny Hill collecting the award on his behalf. In 1990, Sayle had a fatwa proclaimed against him by a Muslim cleric from Syria after a joke on his BBC comedy show Stuff, which has never been withdrawn.

Sayle was signed in 1992 to a seven-year contract to play an Eastern European chef as a regular character on the American sitcom The Golden Palace, the sequel to The Golden Girls, but was fired and replaced by Cheech Marin before the pilot was shot. The series was cancelled after one season.

In 1994, he presented the miniseries Drive, which gave advice for safe driving through Sayle's signature form of humour interspersed with serious pieces. In 2008, he wrote and presented Alexei Sayle's Liverpool, a three-part television series in which he reconnected with his home town. He stated in the programmes that on first hearing that Liverpool was to be awarded the European Capital of Culture, he received much criticism for describing the city as "philistine". He now feels that he does not know whether or not his original statement was true but as a result of making the series he does now consider Liverpool to be his home, and he has vowed to go back there more often in the future.

Sayle also narrated the Public information film (PIF) Moon Lighters about two moon creatures, Biblock and Hoblock and the dangers of lighters. Sayle replaced Rolf Harris as the narrator for the Nick Junior and Milkshake! series Olive The Ostrich. Episodes featuring Sayle's narration commenced broadcasting on 22 July 2013.

Film
Sayle alternates his comedy work with performances as a character actor ranging from serious (Gorky Park, 1983) to humorous (Indiana Jones and the Last Crusade, 1989). He appeared in the 1992 Carry On film, Carry On Columbus along with other modern comedians, including Comic Strip founder Peter Richardson, as well as surviving members of the original Carry On team.

Music

Sayle has released five comedy singles with full musical backing and one live recording from the Comedy Store in London 1981. This was a double A side with Alex Arundel the London-based Scottish songwriter and founding member of Alternative Cabaret with the  song "When The Gold Runs Dry", being the other A side.  His most successful single was "'Ullo John! Gotta New Motor?" which achieved Top 20 chart success in the UK upon re-release in 1984. Produced by Clive Langer and Alan Winstanley (who also produced for Madness and Elvis Costello), the record in its 12-inch version achieved notoriety owing to its extensive use of profane language. The two follow up singles, "Didn't You Kill My Brother?", and "Meanwhile", were taken from the album Panic, the cover of which parodies the cover of the Michael Jackson album Off the Wall.

Writing
Sayle has written two short story collections, five novels, including a graphic novel and a radio series spin-off book, as well as columns for various publications. His book Great Bus Journeys of the World, co-written with David Stafford, is mostly a collection of his columns for Time Out and the Sunday Mirror.  He was one of eight contributory authors to the BBC Three competition End of Story, in which members of the public completed the second half of stories written by established authors. The winning entry to Sayle's story, Imitating Katherine Walker, was written by freelance writer Arthur Allan. Sayle's autobiography Stalin Ate My Homework, which deals with his early life and which he describes as a 'satirical memoir', was published in 2010. In 2012 he joined The Daily Telegraph as a motoring columnist. In early 2015 he toured giving readings from the second volume of his autobiography Thatcher Stole My Trousers, published in 2016.

Internet
In November 2020, Sayle began hosting a monthly podcast, The Alexei Sayle Podcast. Produced/co-hosted by Talal Karkouti, guests have included Josie Long, Stewart Lee, Omid Djalili, Lise Mayer, Diane Morgan and Jeremy Corbyn.

He also launched a YouTube channel, showcasing videos of various bike rides.

Personal life
In 1974, Sayle married Linda Rawsthorn. He lives in Bloomsbury in central London and is a keen cyclist.  He also owns a house near Granada, in southern Spain.

Political views
Around the age of 15, Sayle decided to join the Young Communist League, but only went to a few meetings. In 1968, he joined a Maoist organisation, the Communist Party of Britain (Marxist–Leninist). In 2009, he said that, while no longer active in left politics, "I still would adhere to those philosophical and economic ideas of Marxism that I got when I was sixteen. ... it's seemed to me as true now as it did then".

Sayle is a critic of fox hunting and was among more than 20 high-profile people who signed a letter to Members of Parliament in 2015 to oppose Conservative Prime Minister David Cameron's plan to amend the Hunting Act 2004.

In February 2016, Sayle said of Labour Party leader Jeremy Corbyn: "He's ascetic and morally incorruptible. The propaganda that's thrown against him is disgraceful. Until he appeared, you had to vote for one kind of Oxbridge twat or another, people who all go to the same dinner parties, people like the Ed Ballses and George Osbornes. Jeremy has shown that, within a democratic tradition, other things are possible." In 2016, he wrote a comment piece for The Guardian saying that he was happy to mock New Labour in his act but now that Corbyn was about to "reform the party in his own image – ascetic, socialist, kindly and ethical" he would stop making jokes about Labour.

In May 2018, regarding the expulsion of Marc Wadsworth from the Labour Party, Sayle commented: "The Party should walk over broken glass to beg people of Marc's calibre to work with them – they are very few and Marc is one of the best. There is a battle going on to destroy and reverse the unexpected and amazing gains the left has made in the last three years. Marc is a casualty in that battle and I am joining the fight to see him re-instated to the front line."

In November 2019, along with other public figures, Sayle signed a letter supporting Labour Party leader Jeremy Corbyn describing him as "a beacon of hope in the struggle against emergent far-right nationalism, xenophobia and racism in much of the democratic world" and endorsed him in the 2019 UK general election. In December 2019, along with 42 other leading cultural figures, he signed a letter endorsing the Labour Party under Corbyn's leadership in the 2019 general election. The letter stated that "Labour's election manifesto under Jeremy Corbyn's leadership offers a transformative plan that prioritises the needs of people and the planet over private profit and the vested interests of a few."

In January 2020, he was condemned by some Jewish groups after being one of thousands to sign an open letter criticising Rebecca Long-Bailey and other Labour leadership candidates for saying they would sign a ten-point pledge by the Board of Deputies of British Jews intended to combat anti-semitism should they be elected. The letter was organised by Momentum activist, Jackie Walker and former Labour MP Chris Williamson, both of whom were expelled from Labour in relation to controversial allegations of anti-semitism.

In May 2021, Conservative MP Matthew Offord wrote to the BBC's Director General urging, unsuccessfully, that the planned broadcast of Desert Island Discs on 23 May featuring Sayle be halted on the basis that every broadcaster "should be wary of giving a platform to anyone who is seen to be 'excusing' antisemitism". There was an outcry on social media in response, rejecting the claim that Sayle was doing this, with support for Sayle (who is Jewish) from across the board and the resulting hashtag #IStandWithAlexeiSayle trending on UK Twitter.

Filmography

Film

Television

Radio

Videos
 1983 The Alexei Sayle Pirate Video (Springtime)
 1995 Alexei Sayle's Stuff (Paradox)

DVDs
 2005 Alexei Sayle's Stuff Series One (BBC)
 2006 Alexei Sayle's Stuff Series Two (BBC)
 2006 Alexei Sayle's Stuff Series Three (BBC)

Discography

Albums
1980: Live at The Comic Strip - compiled from mixture of variable quality bootleg private recordings by fans only available as a Tape Cassette (comedy club)
1982: Cak! - LP/Tape (Springtime/Island) 
1984: The Fish People Tapes - LP/Tape (Island) (#62 UK, 11 March 1984 Official Albums Chart Top 100 | Official Charts Company)
1985: Panic - LP/Tape (CBS)

Singles
1981: "Pop-Up Toasters" (as Alexei's Midnight Runners) (Springtime/Island)
1982: "Albania! Albania! (Albanixey! Albanixey!)" (as The Albanian World Cup Squad) (Albaniox)
1982: "'Ullo John! Gotta New Motor?" (Springtime/Island) (#15 UK,18 March 1984 Official Singles Chart Top 100 | Official Charts Company)
1985: "Didn't You Kill My Brother?" (CBS) (#93 Canada, 18 January 1986) 
1986: "Meanwhile" (CBS)

Bibliography
 Train To Hell (Methuen, 9 February 1984; hardcover , paperback ) – novel co-written by David Stafford
 Geoffrey The Tube Train And The Fat Comedian (Methuen, 1987; paperback) – graphic novel, illustrated by Oscar Zárate
 Alexei Sayle's Great Bus Journeys Of The World (Methuen, October 1989; paperback ) – collected columns from Time Out and the Sunday Mirror
 Barcelona Plates (Sceptre, 17 February 2000; hardcover , paperback ) – short story collection
 The Dog Catcher (Sceptre, 19 July 2001; hardcover , paperback ) – short story collection
 Overtaken (Sceptre, 1 September 2003; hardcover ) – despite Train To Hell, this was publicised as being Sayle's first novel
 The Weeping Women Hotel (Sceptre, 27 February 2006; hardcover ) – novel
 Mister Roberts (Sceptre, 16 October 2008; hardcover , paperback ) – Sayle's latest novel
 Stalin Ate My Homework (Sceptre, 2 September 2010; hardcover , paperback ) – autobiography
 Thatcher Stole My Trousers (Bloomsbury, 10 March 2016; hardcover ) – autobiography (second volume)
 Alexei Sayle's Imaginary Sandwich Bar (Bloomsbury, 19 October 2017; hardcover ) – radio series spin-off

Screenplays
 Night Voice (1990)
 'Itch (1990)
 Sorry About Last Night (1995)
 Two Minutes (1996)
 Lose Weight... Ask Me How (2001)

Notes

References

External links

  – official site
 Alexei Sayle – podcast
 
 
 
 Alexei Sayle on This Week, BBC One
 Alexei Sayle review of The Weeping Women Hotel by Spike Magazine
 Alexei Sayle interview with Aly Stoneman, LeftLion Magazine
 Alexei Sayle at 45cat.com
 
 Alexei Sayle at the National Portrait Gallery, London

1952 births
Living people
20th-century English comedians
20th-century English male actors
21st-century English comedians
21st-century English male actors
Alumni of Chelsea College of Arts
British surrealist artists
British surrealist writers
British communists
Cycling advocates
Comedians from Liverpool
Communist Party of Britain (Marxist–Leninist) members
English Jews
English communists
English male comedians
English male film actors
English male radio actors
English male television actors
English male voice actors
English people of Lithuanian-Jewish descent
English podcasters
Island Records artists
Jewish English comedians
Jewish English male actors
Jewish surrealist writers
Jewish socialists
Anti-Zionist Jews
Labour Party (UK) people
Male actors from Liverpool
The Comic Strip